Hasan "Jay" Jalisi (born November 17, 1965) is an American politician who was a Democratic member of the Maryland House of Delegates for District 10, based in Baltimore County, from 2015 to 2023. In 2022, he unsuccessfully ran for Maryland Senate, placing second to state Delegate Benjamin Brooks.

Early life and career
Jalisi was born on November 17, 1965, in Hyderabad, Sindh, Pakistan. His family is from India and later moved to Pakistan, and then to Bangladesh, where his father taught at a medical school. He graduated from B. V. S. Parsi High School in Karachi, Pakistan and later attended the University of Karachi, where he earned a M.D. degree in 1990. After graduating, he moved to the United States and worked positions at Harvard University and the Cleveland Clinic. He came to Baltimore in 1997 to attend Johns Hopkins University, where he earned a M.P.H. degree in international health systems in 1998. While at Hopkins, Jalisi got into real estate investing, using money from family members to buy an apartment building where he lived after learning it was in foreclosure. He was previously a medical doctor and has co-authored two medical textbooks on diseases of the ears, nose, and throat, but eventually stepped back from his medical career to become a full-time real estate investor.

In December 2013, Jalisi filed to run for the Maryland House of Delegates in District 10. He won the Democratic primary, receiving 17.4 percent of the vote, coming in second only behind Delegate Adrienne A. Jones. Jalisi won the general election with 28.7 percent of the vote.

In the legislature
Jalisi was sworn into the Maryland House of Delegates on January 14, 2015. Up until the appointment of Bilal Ali, he was the only Muslim serving in the Maryland General Assembly.

In November 2019, Jalisi filed to run in the 2020 Maryland 7th congressional district special election to fill out the term of the late Elijah Cummings, and in the overlapping regular 2020 election for the same congressional seat. He was defeated by Kweisi Mfume in the Democratic primary for both elections.

In April 2022, Jalisi filed to run for Maryland Senate to succeed retiring Senator Delores G. Kelley. He was defeated in the Democratic primary, placing second to state Delegate Ben Brooks.

Committee assignments
 Member, Environment and Transportation Committee, 2015–present (housing & real property subcommittee, 2015–2018; motor vehicle & transportation subcommittee, 2017–2018; natural resources, agriculture & open space subcommittee, 2015–present; local government & bi-county agencies subcommittee, 2019–present)
 Member, Judiciary Committee, 2015 (civil law & procedure subcommittee, 2015; criminal justice subcommittee, 2015)

Other memberships
 Member, Maryland Legislative Asian-American and Pacific-Islander Caucus, 2015–2019 (treasurer, 2016–2019)
 Member, Legislative Black Caucus of Maryland, 2015–2018
 Member, Maryland Military Installation Legislative Caucus, 2017–present

Legal affairs

In February 2015, Jalisi's daughter filed for a restraining order against him, accusing him of slapping her during an altercation at his wife's home in Lutherville, Maryland. A temporary restraining order was granted, then extended on March 2 after neither Jalisi nor his attorney appeared in court. On March 9, Jalisi and his daughter entered into a consent agreement without a finding of abuse, preventing him from visiting his daughter for a year. Following the incident, House Speaker Michael E. Busch moved Jalisi from the House Judiciary Committee to the House Environment and Transportation Committee.

In March 2019, an ethics committee investigation found that Jalisi subjected his staffers, particularly female employees, to bullying and verbal abuse over a span of five years. The report also said that Jalisi ignored repeated requests from House Speaker Busch and other top lawmakers to take anger management classes, which led to Busch withdrawing his use of state funds to pay his staffers. Jalisi denied the allegations, denouncing the investigation as a "nasty smear campaign and a sham investigation". On March 27, the House of Delegates voted unanimously to reprimand Jalisi. In December 2020, a District Court Judge ordered Jalisi to pay more than $19,500 in back pay and damages to a former legislative aide who did not receive payment for the month he worked for his office.

In October 2014, Jalisi was fined $2,500 for misusing campaign funds.

Unsafe living conditions in Jalisi-owned housing
In October 2014, the Maryland Department of the Environment fined Jalisi $15,000 for lead paint hazards related to at least two apartments in a Baltimore condominium.

In March 2021, a tenant filed a lawsuit against Jalisi's property management firm, HMJ Management Company, for failing to fix water leaks in her bathroom, causing her to slip on the wet floor and hit her head against the wall and a toilet paper stand. The toilet paper stand lodged in her throat and left her unable to call for help, requiring her to receive spinal surgery and leaving her with chronic neck and back pain that left her unable to work.

Political positions

Crime
Jalisi introduced legislation in the 2016 legislative session that would limit strip-searches and shackling. The bill was amended to create a task force to investigate the Department of Juvenile Services' policies on strip-searching and shackling. The bill passed and became law on May 19, 2016.

Environment
In September 2017, the Maryland League of Conservation Voters gave Jalisi a score of 71 percent on its annual legislative scorecard, making him one of three Democrats not to receive a perfect score.

Marijuana
In February 2022, Jalisi declined to vote on legislation that created a framework for legalizing recreational marijuana. In April 2022, Jalisi again declined to vote to override a gubernatorial veto on the bill, citing religious reasons.

Social issues
In April 2021, Jalisi voted in favor of a bill that would create a constitutional ballot referendum that would require lawmakers to live in the districts they represent. The bill passed both chambers of the Maryland General Assembly and will be decided by voters in the 2022 elections.

Jalisi introduced legislation in the 2022 legislative session that would prevent car insurance companies from using a person's credit score in setting a policyholder's premium. The measure was unanimously rejected by the Economic Matters Committee in favor of identical legislation introduced by Delegate Melissa Wells.

Electoral history

References

External links 
 
 
 

Democratic Party members of the Maryland House of Delegates
Living people
21st-century American politicians
1965 births